The Central American mabuya (Marisora unimarginata) is a species of skink found in Costa Rica, Panama, and Nicaragua.

References

Marisora
Reptiles described in 1862
Taxa named by Edward Drinker Cope